Gretna is an unincorporated community in Phillips County, Kansas, United States.

History
Gretna was a station on the Chicago, Rock Island and Pacific Railroad.

The post office in Gretna was discontinued in 1945.

References

Further reading

External links
 Phillips County Kansas
 Phillips County maps: Current, Historic, KDOT

Unincorporated communities in Phillips County, Kansas
Unincorporated communities in Kansas